Equatoguinean–Kosovar relations are foreign relations between Equatorial Guinea and Kosovo. There are no formal diplomatic relations between the two states as Equatorial Guinea has not recognized Kosovo as a sovereign state.

History 
On 1 September 2010, Equatorial Guinea's Permanent Representative to the United Nations, Anatolio Ndong Mba, said during a press conference that his country's foreign policy favours Kosovo's independence. In September 2011, the President of Equatorial Guinea, Teodoro Obiang Nguema Mbasogo, was reported to have responded positively to a request for recognition by Kosovo.

On 21 November 2011, in a meeting with First Deputy Prime Minister of Kosovo, Behgjet Pacolli, President Obiang reportedly promised to immediately begin formalising the recognition of Kosovo. In January 2012, Pacolli's advisor Jetlir Zyberaj stated that Kosovo had received confirmation of recognition from Equatorial Guinea but was awaiting receipt of the note verbale.

See also 

 Foreign relations of Equatorial Guinea
 Foreign relations of Kosovo

Notes

References 

Kosovo
Equatorial Guinea